Charles Eric Leiserson is a computer scientist, specializing in the theory of parallel computing and distributed computing, and particularly practical applications thereof. As part of this effort, he developed the Cilk multithreaded language.  He invented the fat-tree interconnection network, a hardware-universal interconnection network used in many supercomputers, including the Connection Machine CM5, for which he was network architect.  He helped pioneer the development of VLSI theory, including the retiming method of digital optimization with James B. Saxe and systolic arrays with H. T. Kung.  He conceived of the notion of cache-oblivious algorithms, which are algorithms that have no tuning parameters for cache size or cache-line length, but nevertheless use cache near-optimally.  He developed the Cilk language for multithreaded programming, which uses a provably good work-stealing algorithm for scheduling.  Leiserson coauthored the standard algorithms textbook Introduction to Algorithms together with Thomas H. Cormen, Ronald L. Rivest, and Clifford Stein.

Leiserson received a BS degree in computer science and mathematics from Yale University in 1975 and a PhD degree in computer science from Carnegie Mellon University in 1981, where his advisors were Jon Bentley and H. T. Kung.

He then joined the faculty of the Massachusetts Institute of Technology, where he is now a professor.  In addition, he is a principal in the Theory of Computation research group in the MIT Computer Science and Artificial Intelligence Laboratory, and he was formerly director of research and director of system architecture for Akamai Technologies.  He was Founder and chief technology officer of Cilk Arts, Inc., a start-up that developed Cilk technology for multicore computing applications.  (Cilk Arts, Inc. was acquired by Intel in 2009.)

Leiserson's dissertation, Area-Efficient VLSI Computation, won the first ACM Doctoral Dissertation Award.  In 1985, the National Science Foundation awarded him a Presidential Young Investigator Award.  He is a Fellow of the Association for Computing Machinery (ACM), the American Association for the Advancement of Science (AAAS), the Institute of Electrical and Electronics Engineers (IEEE), and the Society for Industrial and Applied Mathematics (SIAM).  He received the 2014 Taylor L. Booth Education Award from the IEEE Computer Society "for worldwide computer science education impact through writing a best-selling algorithms textbook, and developing courses on algorithms and parallel programming."   He received the 2014 ACM-IEEE Computer Society Ken Kennedy Award for his "enduring influence on parallel computing systems and their adoption into mainstream use through scholarly research and development."  He was also cited for "distinguished mentoring of computer science leaders and students."  He received the 2013 ACM Paris Kanellakis Theory and Practice Award for "contributions to robust parallel and distributed computing."

See also
 Thinking Machines Corporation
 Thomas H. Cormen
 Ronald L. Rivest
 Clifford Stein

References

Further reading

External links
 Home page
 Brief Biography
 Charles Leiserson Playlist Appearance on WMBR's Dinnertime Sampler radio show October 27, 2004

American computer scientists
Theoretical computer scientists
Massachusetts Institute of Technology faculty
Fellows of the Association for Computing Machinery
Living people
Researchers in distributed computing
Yale University alumni
Carnegie Mellon University alumni
1953 births
American chief technology officers